The gare de Libourne is a railway interchange station in Libourne, Nouvelle-Aquitaine, France. The station is located on the Paris - Bordeaux, Bordeaux - Bergerac - Sarlat, Bordeaux - Coutras - Périgueux (Line 24 for Limoges and 25 for Brive) and Bordeaux - Angoulême railway lines. The station is served by TGV (high speed) Bordeaux - Paris Intercités Bordeaux - Périgueux - Tulle and to Montlucon via Limoges (long distance) and TER (local) services operated by SNCF.

Train services
The following services currently call at Libourne:
high speed services (TGV) Paris - Bordeaux - Irun
high speed services (TGV) Paris - Bordeaux - Arcachon
high speed services (TGV) Lille - Bordeaux
local service (TER Nouvelle-Aquitaine) Bordeaux - Libourne - Angoulême
local service (TER Nouvelle-Aquitaine) Bordeaux - Libourne - Périgueux - Limoges
local service (TER Nouvelle-Aquitaine) Bordeaux - Libourne - Périgueux - Brive-la-Gaillarde - Ussel
local service (TER Nouvelle-Aquitaine) Bordeaux - Libourne - Bergerac - Sarlat-la-Canéda

Facilities

 5 platforms, of which 4 in use
 Ticket Office
 Ticket Machines
 Car Park (Paid car park in the front and also at the side of the station and free parking on the other side of the railway line)
 Bus Services - Libus 1, 2 and 5
 Toilet
 Convenience shop/Small coffee shop called Casino Shop

Gallery

References

Railway stations in Gironde
Railway stations in France opened in 1852